Cogorno is a comune (municipality) in the Metropolitan City of Genoa in the Italian region Liguria, located about  southeast of Genoa.

The municipality of Cogorno contains the frazioni (subdivisions, mainly villages and hamlets) San Salvatore, Panesi, Monticelli, and Breccanecca.

Cogorno borders the municipalities of Carasco, Chiavari, Lavagna, and Ne.

Demographic evolution

References

External links
 www.comune.cogorno.ge.it/

Cities and towns in Liguria